"Everything" is a song written and recorded by Canadian singer Alanis Morissette. It was released on March 22, 2004, as the first single from her sixth studio album, So-Called Chaos (2004), on which it appears as the closing track. The song reached number three on the Canadian Singles Chart and number six in Italy and Spain. Although it reached only number 76 on the US Billboard Hot 100, it peaked atop the Adult Alternative Songs chart and climbed to number four on the Adult Top 40. "Everything" also reached the top 20 in Australia, Austria, Norway, and Scotland.

Release and reception

A heavily edited version of the song was released to radio stations for airplay on February 23, 2004. The radio version removed over 60 seconds of the track by taking the first two lines from the first section of a verse and placing it together with the last two lines from the second section of the verse, effectively removing a whole verse from the album version. The video version of the track endured further edits, with the replacing of the word "asshole" in the opening line to "nightmare."

Upon release in the US, the song received considerable support and airplay from alternative and adult radio stations, peaking within the top five and spending 26 non-consecutive weeks on Billboards Adult Top 40 chart. Mainstream pop and rock radio stations were less supportive of the track. The song entered Billboard's main Hot 100 chart at number 76, a position it would hold for four weeks, spending a total of nine non-consecutive weeks on the chart. The physical video-enhanced single, however, remains one of the most successful of Morissette's recording career, being certified 4× Platinum by the RIAA on September 30, 2004, for shipment of over 200,000 copies. The song also peaked within the top 20 of the Canadian, Australian, Italian, Austrian, Norwegian, and Scottish singles charts.

Music video
The song's music video was directed by Meiert Avis and was released in March 2004, and features Morissette walking down a road. A man eventually walks up to her and cuts two long pieces of her hair, and when he leaves she is sporting a very short hairstyle; at the time the video was shot Morissette had cut her previously long hair and the scene was shot with her wearing a wig.

The music video is based on and is almost identical to the video for the song "Bonito" by Spanish group Jarabe de Palo, with the same director, Marc Donés. The man that cuts her hair at the beginning of the video is Jarabe de Palo's lead singer, Pau Donés. Three of the people who were seen singing in her "Hands Clean" video also appear who are shown as her dedicated fans. The video peaked at number four on the VH1 Top 20 Video Countdown. It also features Canadian actor Chris William Martin.

Track listings
Canadian, European, and Australian CD single; UK CD1
 "Everything" (radio edit) – 3:31
 "So Unsexy" (Vancouver Sessions) – 5:03
 "Everything" (Vancouver Sessions) – 4:42
 "Everything" (video)

UK CD2
 "Everything" (radio edit) – 3:30
 "Precious Illusions" (Vancouver Sessions) – 4:32

Charts

Weekly charts

Year-end charts

Certifications

Release history

References

2004 singles
2004 songs
Alanis Morissette songs
Maverick Records singles
Microsoft Windows sample music
Music videos directed by Meiert Avis
Reprise Records singles
Song recordings produced by John Shanks
Songs written by Alanis Morissette